Cyrtodactylus cavernicolus is a species of gecko that is endemic to Sarawak.

References 

Cyrtodactylus
Reptiles described in 1962